Gary Schlosser is a film producer who was most active in the late 1960s and early 1970s. He is best known for co-producing the 1966 film Cowboy, for which he was nominated for an Academy Award for Best Documentary, Short Subjects in 1967. Schlosser also served as executive producer of the cinéma vérité documentary film series The Social Seminar, produced by the University of California at Los Angeles for the National Institute of Mental Health from 1970 to 1972.

References

External links

American film producers
Year of birth missing (living people)
Place of birth missing (living people)
Possibly living people